George Lindsay Johnson (10 July 1853 – 1 August 1943) was a British ophthalmologist.

Johnson was born in Manchester. He studied at Victoria University of Manchester (Owens College), Gonville and Caius College, Cambridge and St Bartholomew's Hospital. He obtained his M.D. in 1890 and F.R.C.S. in 1884. He worked at Royal Westminster Ophthalmic Hospital and Manchester Royal Eye Hospital. He published papers on mammalian, reptilian and amphibian eyes. He was also interested in photography.

He moved to South Africa in 1911. In his later life he became interested in psychical research and spiritualism.

Publications
Observations on the Macula Lutea: Histology of the Human Macula  (1896)
Photographic optics and Colour Photography (1909)
Photography in Colours (1916)
Does Man Survive: The Great Problem of the Life Hereafter and the Evidence for Its Solution (1936)

Papers

Johnson, George Lindsay. (1901). Contributions to the Comparative Anatomy of the Mammalian Eye, Chiefly Based on Ophthalmoscopic Examination. Philosophical Transactions of the Royal Society of London. Series B, Containing Papers of a Biological Character 194: 1-82.
Johnson, George Lindsay. (1927). Contributions to the Comparative Anatomy of the Reptilian and the Amphibian Eye, Chiefly Based on Ophthalmological Examination. Philosophical Transactions of the Royal Society of London. Series B, Containing Papers of a Biological Character 215: 315-353.

References

External links
 

1853 births
1943 deaths
Alumni of the University of Manchester
British ophthalmologists
English spiritualists
Parapsychologists